James Bowie (born 1983) is a Canadian lawyer specialising in criminal law, based in Ottawa. He was previously a political staffer for the Liberal Party of Canada.

He is best known for documenting the court appearances of people who protested at the Canada Convoy protest in 2022.

Early life 
Bowie was born in 1983.

Career 
Bowie was licensed to practise law in Ontario in 2015 and launched his sole practise in 2020. He works a sole-practitioner lawyer based in Ottawa, and specialising in criminal law. He previous worked for the Liberal Party of Canada.

He is best known for documenting via Twitter the evidence submissions of Canada Convoy protesters, including Tamara Lich at the 2022 Public Order Emergency Commission. During the convoy protests, he also worked as television news pundit, he told the Law Society of Ontario that he had spoke on CTV, CBC News, and local radio.

In June 2020, he offered free legal services to anyone arrested at an anti-racism protest in Ottawa. In November 2022, Bowie was accused of providing legal services in exchange for sexual acts. Three weeks later, the Law Society of Ontario seized his electronic devices as part of an investigation. The next month, he was fined $5,000 and had his law license indefinitely suspended by the Law Society after failing to produce documentation and information requested by the society. Earlier the same year, he practised law while his license was suspended. Also in December 2022, but in unconnected circumstances, he was accused of offering cocaine and soliciting sexual contact with female clients.

By February 2023, The Law Society had investigated Bowie's work three times, including investigating complaints about how he handled money held in trust for a client.

Personal life 
Bowie lives in the Glebe neighbourhood of Ottawa.

References

External links 
 James Bowie - Twitter

Living people
21st-century Canadian lawyers
Criminal defense lawyers
People from Ottawa
Canada convoy protest
Disbarred lawyers
2022 in Ontario
1983 births
Canadian political commentators